Mogendorf is a municipality in Westerwaldkreis district, Rhineland-Palatinate, in western Germany.

References

Municipalities in Rhineland-Palatinate
Westerwaldkreis